Psydrax bridsoniana is a species of flowering plant in the family Rubiaceae. It is endemic to Cameroon.  Its natural habitat is subtropical or tropical moist lowland forests. It is threatened by habitat loss.

References

bridsoniana
Flora of Cameroon
Endangered plants
Taxonomy articles created by Polbot